Sian Rogers (born 28 June 1998) is an English professional footballer who plays as a goalkeeper for FA Women's Championship club Charlton Athletic on loan from Aston Villa.

Rogers played youth football with Wolverhampton Wanderers, Birmingham City and Arsenal before joining Aston Villa. She made her first-team debut in the 2017–18 FA WSL 2.

Rogers has played for England at several youth levels.

Early life 
Rogers began to play football at the age of six. She was scouted by the Wolverhampton Wanderers centre of excellence, later going on to join Birmingham City. Rogers became a regular for the development side whilst at Birmingham, before signing for Arsenal to be a key part of the successful development side there. She was occasionally an unused substitute at senior level for Birmingham and Arsenal.

Club career

Aston Villa 
Rogers was signed by Aston Villa in the run up to the 2017–18 season.

Rogers received her first red card in a match against Manchester United on 17 April 2019. Her strong performances in the 2018–19 season saw her nominated for the club's player of the season award.

Rogers signed a new two-year contract with Villa in October 2019.
She spent a period out with a shoulder injury during this month. Rogers made her fiftieth appearance in a Villa shirt against Lewes on 24 November 2019. She was awarded the Golden Glove after keeping five clean sheets in thirteen matches as Aston Villa claimed the 2019–20 FA Women's Championship title.

Rogers made her top flight debut against Manchester City on 5 September 2020.

International career 
Rogers was first called up to an England side at the age of 13, before going on to be a part of England U17 squad at the 2014 UEFA Women's Under-17 Championship. In April 2014, she was captain of England women's national under-16 football team for a match against Switzerland.

Rogers was also a part of the squad for the 2015 tournament in Iceland. In 2017, she was part of the England U19 squad for a tournament in La Manga.

Rogers was a part of the preliminary squad for the 2018 FIFA Under-20 Women's World Cup. She took part in an England U21 training camp in January 2019.

Style of play 
Rogers has been identified as a highly competent shot-stopper from a young age. She has worked on developing her kicking ability and distribution.

Personal life 
Rogers is a big film fan.

Career statistics

Club

Honours

Club 
Aston Villa
 FA Women's Championship: 2019–20

Individual 
 FA Women's Championship Golden Glove: 2019–20

References 

1998 births
Living people
English women's footballers
England women's youth international footballers
Women's association football goalkeepers
Aston Villa W.F.C. players
Women's Championship (England) players
Women's Super League players